Tuek Chhou is a district located in Kampot province, in southern Cambodia. It surrounds Krong Kampot, which contains the urban area of Kampot City.

Administration

References 

Districts of Kampot province